The New Ten Commandments is a feature-length documentary film which premiered at the Edinburgh International Film Festival in 2008.  This documentary film is from a Scottish perception.

The film was produced by Nick Higgins from Lansdowne Productions and Noémie Mendelle from the Scottish Documentary Institute and has 10 film-chapter directors for each of the 10 chapters of the film - Kenny Glenaan, Douglas Gordon, Nick Higgins, Irvine Welsh, Mark Cousins, Sana Bilgrami, Alice Nelson, Tilda Swinton, Doug Aubrey, David Graham Scott and Anna Jones.

The film's unifying theme is human rights in Scotland with each chapter illustrating one of the "New Ten Commandments" - 10 articles chosen from the Universal Declaration of Human Rights.

The 10 film chapters of The New Ten Commandments 
The Right to Freedom of Assembly - Director, David Graham Scott
The Right not to be enslaved - Director, Nick Higgins
The Right to a fair trial - Director, Sana Bilgrami
The Right to freedom of expression - Director, Doug Aubrey
The Right to life - Director, Kenny Glenaan
The Right to liberty - Directors, Irvine Welsh & Mark Cousins
The Right not to be tortured - Director, Douglas Gordon
The Right to asylum - Director, Anna Jones
The Right to privacy - Director, Alice Nelson
The Right to freedom of thought - Directors, Mark Cousins & Tilda Swinton

The film was scheduled for its first television broadcast as The New 10 Commandments in Scotland on BBC Two Scotland in December 2008.

References

External links 
The New Ten Commandments webpage.

The New Ten Commandments at the Edinburgh International Film Festival.
The New 10 Commandments] as a [http://www.bbc.co.uk/programmes BBC Programme.

British documentary films
2008 films
English-language Scottish films
2008 documentary films
Codes of conduct
Scottish films
Documentary films about human rights
Human rights in Scotland
British anthology films
Ten Commandments
2000s English-language films
2000s British films